The French Socialist Party (PSF), the second political party to exist under this name, was a political party in France founded in 1919 during the Third Republic which emerged from the right-wing of the French Section of the Workers' International (SFIO). The party was an early social democratic party, as opposed to the Marxist SFIO.

The party was weak and merged with the Republican-Socialist Party and the Socialist Party of France-Jean Jaurès Union to form the Socialist Republican Union (USR) in 1935. The USR participated in the Popular Front.

References

Defunct political parties in France
Political parties of the French Third Republic
Socialist parties in France